2,4-Dihydroxy-7-methoxy-2H-1,4-benzoxazin-3(4H)-one 2-D-glucosyltransferase (uridine diphosphoglucose-2,4-dihydroxy-7-methoxy-2H-1,4-benzoxazin-3(4H)-one 2-glucosyltransferase, BX8, BX9, benzoxazinoid glucosyltransferase, DIMBOA glucosyltransferase) is an enzyme with systematic name UDP-alpha-D-glucose:2,4-dihydroxy-7-methoxy-2H-1,4-benzoxazin-3(4H)-one 2-beta-D-glucosyltransferase. This enzyme catalyses the following chemical reaction

 (1) UDP-alpha-D-glucose + 2,4-dihydroxy-7-methoxy-2H-1,4-benzoxazin-3(4H)-one  UDP + (2R)-4-hydroxy-7-methoxy-3-oxo-3,4-dihydro-2H-1,4-benzoxazin-2-yl beta-D-glucopyranoside
 (2) UDP-alpha-D-glucose + 2,4-dihydroxy-2H-1,4-benzoxazin-3(4H)-one  UDP + (2R)-4-hydroxy-3-oxo-3,4-dihydro-2H-1,4-benzoxazin-2-yl beta-D-glucopyranoside

The enzyme is involved in the detoxification of the benzoxazinoids, DIBOA (2,4-dihydroxy-2H-1,4-benzoxazin-3(4H)-one) and DIMBOA (2,4-dihydroxy-7-methoxy-2H-1,4-benzoxazin-3(4H)-one).

References

External links 
 

EC 2.4.1